Östermalm is a residential area in Luleå, Sweden. It had 1,226 inhabitants in 2010.

References

External links
Östermalm at Luleå Municipality

Luleå